Lim Tean (born 17 November 1964) is a Singaporean lawyer and politician. He is the founder of the political party Peoples Voice. He previously served as secretary-general of the National Solidarity Party from 30 August 2015 to 18 May 2017.

Early life
Lim was born in 1964 as the eldest son of Lim Chin Teong, a senior civil servant who served as Chief Executive Director of the People's Association (PA) between the late 1970s and early 1980s. His mother, Aw Eng Lian, was a Chinese-language teacher at Zhonghua Girls School for over 40 years. Both of Lim's parents graduated from Nanyang University, a defunct university in Singapore.

At the age of seven, Lim enrolled into Montfort Junior School for his primary education but was disrupted after his father accepted a posting by the Singapore Government as First Secretary in Singapore's mission to the Soviet Union, and Lim travelled with his family to live in Moscow. While in the Soviet Union, Lim attended the Anglo-American School of Moscow between 1971 and 1974.

After three years in the Soviet Union, Lim's parents became increasingly worried about the future of his children's education. They resolved for Lim's father to return to Singapore and transfer to the civil service. Consequently, Lim returned to Montfort Junior School as a Primary 4 student. He continued there and went on to attend Montfort Secondary School. After graduating from Montfort Secondary School, Lim entered Hwa Chong Junior College, where he was a student councillor. He took biology, physics, chemistry and mathematics for his A Level examinations.

After his graduation from Hwa Chong Junior College, Lim enlisted into the Singapore Armed Forces (SAF) to complete his National Service and was commissioned as an artillery officer.

Legal career 
In 1985, Lim went to England to study law at the University of Reading. He was conferred a LLB in 1988 and resided in London as a qualified barrister at the Middle Temple. He was called to the Bar of England and Wales in 1989. He further studied a Master of Law (LLM) degree at Gonville and Cauis College at the University of Cambridge. Lim remained in Cambridge from 1989 to 1990.

After being conferred his LLM, Lim returned to Singapore and was recruited by Drew & Napier LLC in 1990. He was admitted to the Singapore Bar in June 1991. At Drew and Napier, Lim became the pupil of Steven Chong, who became the Singaporean Attorney-General from 2012 to 2014. Lim joined Rajah & Tann Singapore LLP on 2 January 1998 and became its Head of the Admiralty & Shipping department in 2000. In 2007, Lim was promoted to equity partnership in Rajah and Tann.

Concurrently in 2007, Lim took a sabbatical from the legal practice to explore the business world. He founded an Indonesian mining company based out of Sulawesi. His mining company became the first company to produce and ship iron-ore from the island. In 2017, Lim returned to Singapore and founded his law firm Carson Law Chambers.

Defamation trial between Leong Sze Hian and Lee Hsien Loong

Lim represented anti-government critic and blogger Leong Sze Hian in a defamation case brought by current Singaporean Prime Minister Lee Hsien Loong on 8 December 2018. A cross-examination of Lee was held from 6 to 9 October 2020. However the trial ended in 2 days, on 7 October, following a surprise move by Lim in arguing that there was "no case to submit" before Leong was scheduled to take the stand to be cross-examined.

The trial began with the cross examination of Prime Minister Lee Hsien Loong on 6 October. It lasted for 5 hours. On the second day of the trial an expert witness named Dr Phan Tuan Quang from the Hong Kong University Business School for the Plaintiff was cross examined. This too lasted for slightly over 5 hours and the case was closed after. The closing written submissions was due on 30 November 2020 and it had been agreed that these would not exceed 200 pages. In March 2021, the High Court ordered for Leong Sze Hian to pay Prime Minister Lee Hsien Loong $133,000, which Lim called it ‘a wrong and deeply flawed’ decision.

Political career
Lim first became involved in politics in 2011 when he joined the National Solidarity Party (NSP). However, he remained relatively inactive within the party until 2015, when then Secretary-General Hazel Poa resigned in protest over the party's policy regarding multi-cornered contests.

Just a week before the 2015 General Elections, NSP approached Lim and invited him to serve as their new Secretary-General. Despite the relatively short time before the election, Lim accepted and along with a team of candidates contested Tampines Group Representation Constituency (GRC), receiving 24.9% of the votes cast. In May 2017, Lim resigned from his position, citing disagreements with the party.

In 2018, Lim together with other opposition leaders called for an alliance of Singaporean opposition parties, with Tan Cheng Bock being proposed as its leader. However, this failed to materialise. The call for a similar alliance was repeated before the general elections in 2020.

On 29 October 2018, Lim announced the founding of a new political party, Peoples Voice, headed by himself. Peoples Voice contested in the 2020 Singaporean general election for two GRCs and one Single Member Constituency (SMC), with Lim contesting Jalan Besar GRC with three other party members.

Ongoing litigation proceedings

Bankruptcy applications 
In September 2013, a Chinese national, Huang Min, and Lim entered into an agreement in which Huang agreed to lend US$150,000 to Lim. However, their agreement was disputed over whether it was a loan or a deposit for the purchase of the iron ore mine. Lim appealed to the High Court but withdrew the appeal on 15 January 2019. A day later, he issued two cheques to settle the monies and legal costs, ahead of another hearing scheduled on 17 January 2019, and Huang withdrew the application.

An article by The Straits Times published on 22 June 2020 stated that Lim is involved in two bankruptcy applications from DBS Bank and Sing Wing (I & E), a trading company, totalling about S$1.45 million. A hearing for the application by Sing Wing (I & E) was scheduled on 16 July 2020, while there was no further details about DBS Bank's applications. In an interview with The Online Citizen, Lim denied the bankruptcy applications by DBS and Sing Wing, and said it was a smearing technique to damage his image by the mainstream media. Lim stated that he was not contacted by The Straits Times and that he was "not going to be bankrupted" and the sum owed was "total rubbish".

Alleged criminal breach of trust and harassment charges 
On 2 October 2020, Lim was arrested after he refused to cooperate with the police by not turning for a compulsory police interview scheduled on 28 September, of which could be rescheduled, and not intending to be interviewed. He was suspected for alleged criminal breach of trust, in which a former client reported him for allegedly misappropriating a sum of money awarded to him as damages by the court. He was also suspected of unlawful stalking, in which a former female employee alleged harassment from him while being employed in his law firm. The arrest was carried out while Lim was preparing with Leong for an upcoming cross-examination of Lee in the defamation lawsuit. Lim alleged that the investigations were politically motivated, which the police refuted, stating that it had a duty to investigate the allegations. Leong later posted bail for Lim.

Lim sought for a judicial review to discontinue investigations on him by the authorities, however it was dismissed by a judge on 8 December 2020, stating that the application "utterly devoid of any legal merit whatsoever".

References 

Living people
20th-century Singaporean lawyers
1964 births
National Solidarity Party (Singapore) politicians
Alumni of Gonville and Caius College, Cambridge
Alumni of the University of Reading
21st-century Singaporean lawyers
Hwa Chong Junior College alumni
21st-century Singaporean businesspeople
Political party founders